Kappa Delta Chi Sorority, Inc., also known as K-D Chi (pronounced Kay-Dee-Kie) is a Greek letter, intercollegiate Latina founded sorority in the United States. KDChi is a 501(c)(7) organization that prides itself on graduating all of its members, community service to the local and national community, professional networking and producing leaders that continue to give back to its own members and the surrounding communities.

Purpose
The Purpose of Kappa Delta Chi is to promote the traditional values of Unity, Honesty, Integrity and Leadership among women at colleges and universities. Through numerous service events, sisterhood retreats and academic and cultural workshops, KDChi's learn more about themselves and each other. They sprout into impacting leaders and help guide the next generation to success. KDChi is a Latina founded, community-service driven sorority full of sisters of all backgrounds and professions.

Mission statement
Kappa Delta Chi Sorority is a Latina founded, 501 (c) 7, national sorority who aims to achieve professional development, academic excellence, and graduation of all its members; an organization dedicated to community service to their local university communities with an emphasis on the Hispanic/Latino population.

History

Founding 
Kappa Delta Chi Sorority was established at Texas Tech University in Lubbock, Texas by four friends, Cynthia Garza Fleitman, Irene Montoya Robinson, Melissa Montoya Cannon and Nellie Flores Ledesma, who recognized the need to unify and promote leadership amongst Hispanic women at the university. The founders are, however, no longer active within the organization. Their dream was to create something more lasting than a club. It was to be an entity that would extend beyond their college days. They sought to incorporate the principles of unity, honesty, integrity, and leadership into this organization.

Kappa Delta Chi became a nationally recognized sorority with the induction of the first chapter outside of Texas in 1991, which was the Delta chapter at the University of Arizona, in Tucson, AZ. Over the years, Kappa Delta Chi has grown to include women of various ethnicities and cultures and has inducted other chapters throughout the country. All with the common premise of joining Kappa Delta Chi because of the scholastic, philanthropic, and ethical standards that it cultivates and encourages. These are the standards that we emanate through sisterly friendship and servitude to each other and to those around us.

Charter Members
The four founders began the steps to become recognized as an organization at the university and asked Marlene Hernandez, Associate Director of New Student Relations to be their adviser. The Founders enlisted the aid of ten women to help promote the ideals and philosophy of the sorority to other Hispanic women at Texas Tech. These ten women are known as the Charter members of Kappa Delta Chi. They are as follows:

Rocio Briseno
Melissa Chavez
Mary Garza
Maria Pando
Christella Rivera
Carline Soto
Theresa Reyes
Doris Mendiola
Suzanna Cisneros
Dahlia Cavazos

Due to the hard work and effort of the Founders and the Charter members, Kappa Delta Chi was recognized as an official organization at Texas Tech University on April 6, 1987. This historic day is officially recognized as Kappa Delta Chi's founding date.

Kappa Delta Chi became a nationally recognized sorority with the induction of the first chapter outside of Texas in 1991. Over the years, Kappa Delta Chi has grown to include women of various ethnicities and cultures and has inducted chapters at 8 states throughout the country. All with the common premise of joining Kappa Delta Chi because of the scholastic, philanthropic, and ethical standards that it cultivates and encourages.

Philanthropy
As the result of the organization's diligent work and determination, Kappa Delta Chi was recognized as a community service-based, nonprofit corporation by the State of Texas on September 25, 1997. Subsequently, the organization became known as Kappa Delta Chi Sorority, Inc.

Undergraduate chapters of Kappa Delta Chi hold an annual Bowl-A-Thon or KD Kick ball event that funds the majority of the projects that the National Foundation sponsors.  The Foundation receives, manages and distributes scholarship funds, annual gifts, and other donations for the purpose of funding educational and leadership development programs for the communities we support and the American Cancer Society, the national philanthropy of Kappa Delta Chi.

The Kappa Delta Chi Foundation High School Scholarship was established in 1999 to help graduating high school women enter their first year of college. The scholarship is available on a competitive basis and is a onetime award. The scholarship(s) ranges from $500–$1,000.
“We are very proud to be helping these women continue their education with the Kappa Delta Chi Sorority, Inc. National Foundation Scholarship, as well as the Irene Montoya Scholarship. We know and hope they will continue to strive for excellence” said Kandice R. Cruz, Director of Philanthropy & Scholarships.

The money raised by the Kappa Delta Chi Foundation is used for the purpose of funding educational and leadership development programs for our local communities as well as for scholarships for deserving high school students and members of Kappa Delta Chi. Since its beginning in 1999, the Kappa Delta Chi Scholarship Fund has given over $25,000 in educational awards.  The Foundation has also integrated grants that undergraduate and alumnae chapters can apply for so that they can implement service learning projects such as educational and leadership programming.

On September 10, 2007, Kappa Delta Chi Sorority Inc. awarded $3,000 in scholarships to four college bound high school students (out of a pool of 300 applicants) and donated $5,000 to the American Cancer Society. The Foundation has also added the Irene Montoya Scholarships to include members pursuing their undergraduate and graduate careers.

Entities

Chapters
This is the chapter list for Kappa Delta Chi:
Α - Texas Tech University
Β - Texas A&M University
Γ - University of Texas-El Paso
Δ - University of Arizona
Ε - University of Texas at Arlington
Ζ - Sam Houston State University
H - West Texas A&M University
Θ - University of Houston
Ι - New Mexico State University
Κ - Northern Arizona University
Λ - Arizona State University
Μ - Eastern New Mexico University
N - Tarleton State University
Ξ - Prairie View A&M University
Ο - Texas State University
Π - University of Texas at Austin
Ρ - Washington State University
Σ - University of Oklahoma
Τ - University of Wisconsin–Milwaukee
Υ - Southern Methodist University
Φ - Stephen F. Austin State University
Χ - University of Texas at San Antonio
Ψ - Saint Mary's University
Ω - Reserved
ΑΑ - Wichita State University
ΑΒ - University of Texas Rio Grande Valley
ΑΓ - California State University-Dominguez Hills
ΑΔ - Texas A&M University–Kingsville
ΑΕ - Baylor University
ΑΖ - University of Nevada, Las Vegas
ΑΗ - University of Nevada, Reno
ΑΘ - University of Houston–Downtown
ΑΙ - Texas A&M International University
ΑΚ - University of Wisconsin–Madison
ΑΛ - Eastern Washington University
ΑΜ - Texas Southern University
ΑΝ - Midwestern State University
ΑΞ - Texas A&M University-Commerce
ΑΟ - University of New Mexico
ΑΠ - University of Washington
ΑΡ - Lamar University
ΑΣ - Florida State University
ΑΤ - Southwestern University
ΑΥ - University of North Texas
ΑΦ - California State University-Monterey Bay
ΑΧ - University of Utah
ΑΨ - Oregon State University
ΑΩ - Southern Illinois University Carbondale
ΒΑ - University of Illinois Urbana-Champaign - No longer active
ΒΒ - Clarkson University
ΒΓ - Our Lady of the Lake University
ΒΔ - Western Oregon University
ΒΕ - Michigan State University
ΒΖ - University of Texas-Dallas
ΒΗ - Colorado State University-Fort Collins
ΒΘ - Northeastern Illinois University
ΒΙ - Oklahoma State University
ΒΚ - University of Central Oklahoma
ΒΛ - University of California Merced
ΒΜ - Portland State University
ΒΝ - Emporia State University   
ΒΞ - University of South Carolina
ΒΟ - Northwestern University
ΒΠ - University of North Texas-Dallas
ΒΡ - California State University, Los Angeles
ΒΣ - Heritage University
ΒΤ - California State University, San Bernardino
ΒΥ - Northern Illinois University
ΒΦ - Auburn University
ΒΧ - University of Idaho
ΒΨ - University of West Florida
ΒΩ - University of Southern California
ΓΑ - Texas A&M University–Corpus Christi
ΓΒ - California State University at Sacramento

Colonies
This is the colony list of Kappa Delta Chi:
University of the Incarnate Word
Kansas State University
University of Northern Colorado
Western Michigan University
University of Kansas
University of Nebraska-Lincoln
Florida International University

KDChi Quick Facts
Kappa Delta Chi was recognized as an official organization at Texas Tech University on April 6, 1987
KDChi's National Headquarters is in Lubbock, Texas.
KDChi has an established National Alumni Association with alumnae chapters and regions coast to coast.
KDChi supports two National Philanthropy endeavors, the Kappa Delta Chi Foundation and the American Cancer Society.
KDChi has university-recognized chapters throughout the United States.
KDChi is in 18 states throughout the country including Texas, New Mexico, Arizona, California, Colorado, New York, Nevada, Washington, Wisconsin, Kansas, Oklahoma, Florida, Oregon, Idaho, Illinois, South Carolina, Michigan, and is the only Latino Greek entity in the state of Utah and interests in various other states across the nation.
KDChi has undergraduate and alumni sisters worldwide with official undergrad and alumni chapters from Coast to Coast.
KDChi has a graduate intake program, with graduate sisters and chapters.
KDChi holds the penguin as its mascot.
KDChi holds the pink rose as its flower.
KDChi prohibits hazing.
The official KDChi motto as voted on the national body and the marketing committee was chosen in 2008 and it is "Leading with Integrity, United through Service." This motto exemplifies what the sorority represents.
Civil Rights Advocate Dolores Huerta is an honorary sister of Kappa Delta Chi Sorority Inc. as of January 2001 as inducted by Alpha Alpha Chapter of KDChi in Wichita, Kansas.
KDChi celebrated its 30th Anniversary in April 2017
Annually, KDChi holds a National Conference where leadership, sisterhood and training special events takes place.
KDChi is a member of the National Association of Latino Fraternal Organizations (NALFO).
In 2011, Kappa Delta Chi Sorority won the following 5 prestigious awards from NALFO: National Organization of the Year, *Campus Leadership Excellence- Diana Pena - Pi Chapter, University of Texas at Austin, *Undergraduate Chapter of the Year - Alpha Sigma Chapter from Florida State University. This is the second consecutive year they win this award. *Organizational Leadership Excellence - Mary Gonzalez - KDChi Vice President of Collegiate Affairs and Pi Chapter Alum and *Professional of the Year - Gina Garcia - KDChi Vice President of Public Affairs and Pi Chapter Alum.
In 2010, Kappa Delta Chi Sorority won the prestigious awards from NALFO: Philanthropic Organization of the year, Best Undergraduate Chapter -Alpha Sigma Chapter at Florida State University, Professional of the Year- Delia Garcia, and Rising Professional of the Year- Mary Gonzalez.

Notable Members 
 Retired United States Marine Major General - Angela Salinas
 Civil and Human Rights activist - Dolores Huerta 
 Texas State Representative - Mary E. González
 Contemporary artist and educator - Natalia Anciso
 Kansas Secretary of Labor - Delia Garcia

References

External links
 

Student organizations established in 1987
National Association of Latino Fraternal Organizations
Student societies in the United States
Hispanic and Latino American organizations
1987 establishments in Texas